Katemjan-e Yusefali (also Romanized as Katemjān-e Yūsef‘alī and Kotamjān-e Yūsef‘alī) is a village in Ziabar Rural District, in the Central District of Sowme'eh Sara County, Gilan Province, Iran. At the 2006 census, its population was 100, in 36 families.

References 

Populated places in Sowme'eh Sara County